Villeneuve-au-Chemin is a commune in the Aube department in north-central France.

Its principal centres of interest reside in its church and the vault Saint Joseph, formerly places of pilgrimage.

Population

See also
Communes of the Aube department

References

Communes of Aube
Aube communes articles needing translation from French Wikipedia